Soash is a ghost town in Howard County, Texas, United States. It was established by the Soash Development Company in 1909.

References

Unincorporated communities in Howard County, Texas
1909 establishments in Texas
Ghost towns in Texas
Unincorporated communities in Texas